Reginald Boulers (died 1459) was a medieval Abbot of Gloucester, Bishop of Hereford and Bishop of Coventry and Lichfield.

Boulers became abbot of the abbey of St Peter at Gloucester in 1437. Boulers was a shrewd man of affairs and was sent on an embassy to Rome in 1449, when the convent allowed him £400 for his expenses. In 1450, he was seized by Richard Plantagenet, 3rd Duke of York, and imprisoned for a time in Ludlow Castle. In the same year, Boulers was appointed to the See of Hereford on 14 August 1450 and consecrated on 14 February 1451. He was translated to the see of Coventry and Lichfield on 7 February 1453.

Shortly before his death he willed his books to the library at Gloucester Abbey. Boulers died in office sometime between 24 March and 10 April 1459.

Citations

References

 
 
 
 
 

Year of birth unknown
1459 deaths
Abbots of Gloucester
English Benedictines
15th-century English Roman Catholic bishops
Benedictine bishops
Bishops of Hereford
Bishops of Lichfield
Benedictine abbots